Typhoon Megi, known in the Philippines as Typhoon Helen, was a large and powerful tropical cyclone which affected Taiwan and eastern China in late September 2016. It is the seventeenth named storm and the seventh typhoon of the annual typhoon season.

Meteorological history

A tropical disturbance formed northeast of Pohnpei on September 19. Two days later, the Japan Meteorological Agency (JMA) upgraded the low-pressure area to a tropical depression early on September 21, and the Joint Typhoon Warning Center (JTWC) also issued a Tropical Cyclone Formation Alert shortly after that; however, the low-level circulation center (LLCC) of that disorganized system was exposed with fragmented convection. The JMA upgraded the system to a tropical storm and named it Megi early on September 23, when the JTWC also indicated that the monsoonal circulation had consolidated, resulting in upgrading it to a tropical depression but lacking of a definitive center. Six hours later, the JTWC upgraded Megi to a tropical storm. When formative banding and cloud tops were improving and cooling late on the same day, the JMA further upgraded the broad system to a severe tropical storm.

Tracking along the southwestern periphery of the deep-layered subtropical ridge on September 24, Megi was trying to form an eye that prompted both of the JMA and then the JTWC upgrading it to a typhoon. It also received the name Helen from PAGASA as the system entered the Philippine Area of Responsibility on the same day. However, despite being under excellent environmental conditions, Megi stopped intensifying further since September 25. Located in an area of low vertical wind shear and above warm sea surface temperatures near 30ºC, diurnal weakening of convection still continued to occur, especially over the northern half of the system. With excellent radial outflow tapping into westerlies and a large tropical upper tropospheric trough (TUTT) cell to the east, a defined eye remained absent from the typhoon. After completing an eyewall replacement cycle on September 26, Megi eventually started to strengthen more in the afternoon, resulting in a ragged but larger eye embedded in this large typhoon. The JMA indicated that Megi had reached its peak intensity at 18:00 UTC, with ten-minute maximum sustained winds at 155 km/h (100 mph) and the central pressure at 940 hPa (27.76 inHg).

Megi's large eye was temporarily more defined early on September 27; however it soon became cloud-filled as the typhoon had approached the eastern coast of Taiwan. Shortly before Megi made landfall over Hualien City at 14:00 NST (06:00 UTC), it had already intensified into a stronger typhoon at around 03:00 UTC, with one-minute maximum sustained winds at 220 km/h (140 mph) indicated by the JTWC, equivalent to Category 4 of the Saffir–Simpson hurricane wind scale. Subsequently, interaction with the high mountains of Taiwan caused Megi to weaken significantly and the typhoon emerged into the Taiwan Strait from Mailiao at 21:10 NST (13:10 UTC). At 04:40 CST on September 28 (20:40 UTC on September 27), Megi made landfall over Hui'an County, Fujian as a minimal typhoon.

Impact

Taiwan

Megi left 3.89 million households without power as it made landfall in Taiwan, the second worst blackout in history after Typhoon Soudelor's record-breaking 4.85 million households in August 2015. The storm forced more than 14,000 people to evacuate from mountainous areas near the coast to government shelters. At least four were killed across Taiwan, while more 625 others were injured, including 8 Japanese tourists whose bus overturned. More than 400 flights were cancelled, while train services were also halted during the passage of Megi. By October 1 the death toll in Taiwan had risen to 8 - five due to indirect causes, such as falls and traffic accidents, and three people who died when a landslide destroyed their house in southern Kaohsiung County.

Early estimates suggested Taiwan's agricultural sector suffered losses of NT$1.03 billion (US$31.9 million), with around 19,000 hectares of crops damaged in total. By September 29 the total amount of damages in the agricultural sector had risen to NT$1.31 billion (US$42 million), with Yunlin County in western Taiwan accounting for more than a quarter of all of them. Government officials also announced that 814 school campuses across Taiwan were damaged, at an estimated cost of NT$161 million (US$4.17 million). In all, 8 people were killed in Taiwan, and total economic losses were counted to be NT$3.36 billion (US$106.9 million).

Mainland China
The typhoon left at least one person dead as it made landfall in Fujian, while 27 others were missing after a massive landslide engulfed part of a village in the eastern Zhejiang Province, swallowing up dozens of houses. By September 30 the death toll had risen to at least 4, as rescuers in Sucun village, Suichang County, pulled three bodies from the rubble of collapsed houses. A total of 20 houses were buried, while 17 others were flooded in Sucun, as an estimated 400,000 cubic meters slid down the mountainside. At least 15 people were rescued there, while 26 others remained missing, in addition to 6 people in nearby Baofang. The death toll in mainland China had risen to at least 16 by October 5, as authorities were still trying to locate 17 missing persons in Sucun.

Xinhua News Agency reported that more than 120,000 people were evacuated by Fujian authorities, while the province's 31,700 fishing boats were recalled to port. China Southern Airlines cancelled several dozen flights due to the approaching storm. More than 1,200 houses were destroyed and over 10,000 were damaged during the passage of Megi, which affected an estimated 209 million people. In all, 44 people were killed in mainland China, and total damages were amounted to CNY9.7 billion (US$1.45 billion).

See also

Typhoon Talim (2005)
Typhoon Longwang
Typhoon Dujuan (2015)
Typhoon Meranti

References

External links

JMA General Information of Typhoon Megi (1617) from Digital Typhoon
JMA Best Track Data of Typhoon Megi (1617) 
20W.MEGI from the U.S. Naval Research Laboratory

2016 disasters in China
2016 in Taiwan
2016 Pacific typhoon season
September 2016 events in Asia
Typhoons in China
Typhoons in Taiwan
Megi